Çerkezköy is a town and district of Tekirdağ Province in the Marmara Region of Turkey.

Facts
Çerkezköy is located in inland Thrace just to the west of the outlying Istanbul districts of Çatalca and Silivri. Çerkezköy is an industrial area. The total population is 146,319 (as of 2016.) The mayor is Vahap Akay (CHP).

History
Until the 1800s this was a village called 'Türbedere'. 'Türbe' is the Turkish for 'tomb' and the village took its name from the tomb of the eldest son of sultan Bayezid I, Süleyman Çelebi, who was murdered here in 1410 when fleeing from his brothers during the Ottoman Interregnum.  The tomb was destroyed by Bulgarian troops when they occupied the town for nine months during the war for Bulgarian Independence in 1912.

Çerkezköy was founded as a settlement for refugees from the Caucasus following the Russo-Turkish War of 1877-1878 ('Çerkez' being the Turkish pronunciation of 'Circassian'). Soon after, following the independence of Bulgaria from the Ottoman Empire further waves of refugees from Bulgaria came to replace the Caucasians and Çerkezköy was designated as a municipality in 1911. It became a township of Saray district in 1922 and a district in 1938.

The land here is flat, watered by the River Çorlu and good soil for farming, so until the 1970s Çerkezköy was a pleasant small town in a rural setting. But it is also on the main highway from Istanbul to Europe and in 1971 was designated an area for industrial development.

Çerkezköy today

Today industrial development has spread beyond the originally designated industrial area and all kinds of goods are produced in the hundreds and hundreds of factories in Çerkezköy, including textiles, plastic and rubber goods, paints and chemicals. Prominent manufacturers include the large white goods manufacturers Arçelik or BSH, automotive parts producers, textile plant of Mavi or Sabancı Holding's woollen textile factory Yünsa. 

Now only 15% of the people work in agriculture and Çerkezköy has a large industrial working class population, living in housing projects sprawled around the fringes of the town. The Caucasusian identity that gave the town its name no longer exists, it has been swamped by an influx of people from all over Turkey. There are jobs here and the town is easily reached by bus from Istanbul. 

The town centre is a typical Turkish collection of rows of grey low-rise blocks containing public buildings, small supermarkets, banks, and kebab restaurants, with a square in the middle containing a statue of Mustafa Kemal Atatürk and nearby a large central mosque. 

The military base in Çerkezköy is Turkey's biggest centre for basic training in military service. The town is well equipped with schools, hospitals and other infrastructure.

Transportation
The D567 (İstanbul-Tekirdağ Road) passes along the eastern limits of the town while the İstanbul-Çerkezköy road passes through the town center.

The Turkish State Railways operates trains through the Çerkezköy railway station. There is a daily regional train operating to and from İstanbul as well as trains to Edirne and Uzunköprü.

Çerkezköy Railway Station gained importance after the closure of Halkali Terminal due to construction works.  Almost all trains working between Turkey and Europe started to depart from here which used to have only 340 mt of ramp for loading/unloading. To prevent the congestion, TCDD constructed a new container storage area at the eastern side of terminal which allows 3 full trains to be loaded/unloaded at the same time.

Neighbourhoods 

 Bağlık
 Cumhuriyet
 Fatih
 Fevzi Paşa
 Gazi Mustafa Kemal Paşa
 Gazi Osman Paşa
 İstasyon
 Kızılpınar Atatürk
 Kızılpınar Namık Kemal
 Kızılpınar Gültepe
 Veliköy
 Yıldırım Beyazıt

References

External links

 Tekirdağ governor's official website
 District municipality's official website
 Popular Website
Çerkezköy Nerede 
 Cerkezkoy Firms and Trade

Towns in Turkey
Populated places in Tekirdağ Province
Districts of Tekirdağ Province